Chengzhong Subdistrict is a subdistrict and the seat of the city of Yingcheng, Hubei province, People's Republic of China.

Administrative divisions
, it has 11 residential communities and 4 villages under its administration. In 2016, the subdistrict was made up of 12 communities and four villages.

Twelve communities:
Yueyuan, Wangjiatai, Sanyanjing, Guchengtai, Nianwu, Guangming, Gucheng, Gongnonglu, Xinhe, Changhu, Xingxing, Chuntianmingyuan

Four villages:
Fanhe, Baofeng, Guoguang, Zhouchen

References

Township-level divisions of Hubei